Dustin Crum (born January 5, 1999) is a gridiron football quarterback who is currently a member of the Ottawa Redblacks of the Canadian Football League (CFL). He played college football at Kent State. Crum has also been a member of the Kansas City Chiefs of the NFL.

Early life and high school
Crum grew up in Grafton, Ohio and attended Midview High School, where he played baseball, basketball and football. As a senior he completed 173 of 279 passes for 2,615 yards and 32 touchdowns while also rushing for 1,557 yards and 14 touchdowns and was named Division II All-Ohio First-team and a finalist for Mr. Ohio Football.

College career
Crum completed 16-of-30 passes for 232 yards, one touchdown and two interceptions as a freshman. As a sophomore, he completed 16-of-27 passes for 176 yards and two touchdowns. He started the last twelve games of his junior season and passed for 2,625 yards and 20 touchdowns against 2 interceptions while also rushing for 707 yards and 6 touchdowns. Crum was named the MVP of the 2019 Frisco Bowl after passing for 289 yards and two touchdowns and rushing for a career-high 147 yards and a touchdown on 23 carries in the first bowl victory in Kent State's history.

Crum entered his senior season on the watchlists for the Davey O'Brien and Manning Awards. He was named first-team All-Mid-American Conference (MAC) as a senior after passing 1,182 yards and 12 touchdowns  over four games during the team's COVID-19-shortened 2020 season. Crum decided to utilize the extra year of eligibility granted to college athletes who played in the 2020 season due to the coronavirus pandemic and return to Kent State for a fifth season In his final season at Kent State, he was named the MAC Most Valuable Player after passing for 3,187 yards with 20 touchdowns and six interceptions rushing for 703 yards and 12 touchdowns on 161 carries.

Professional career

Kansas City Chiefs 
Crum was signed by the Kansas City Chiefs as an undrafted free agent on April 30, 2022, shortly after the conclusion of the 2022 NFL Draft. He was waived on August 27, 2022.

Ottawa Redblacks 
On September 6, 2022 Crum signed with the Ottawa Redblacks of the Canadian Football League (CFL); midway through the 2022 CFL season.

References

External links
 Kansas City Chiefs bio
Kent State Golden Flashes bio

1999 births
Living people
American football quarterbacks
Kansas City Chiefs players
Kent State Golden Flashes football players
People from Lorain County, Ohio
Players of American football from Ohio
Sportspeople from Greater Cleveland
Ottawa Redblacks players